Robert Whitehurst (born August 16, 1956) is an American former sailor. He competed in the 470 event at the 1976 Summer Olympics.

References

External links
 

1956 births
Living people
American male sailors (sport)
Olympic sailors of the United States
Sailors at the 1976 Summer Olympics – 470
Sportspeople from Seattle